The 65th Wyoming State Legislature is the current meeting of the Wyoming Legislature, starting on January 10, 2019.

The Republican Party holds a supermajority in the legislature, which began meeting in 2013; 50 of the 60 seats in the House and 27 of the 30 seats in the Senate are held by Republicans.

Senate

Leadership

Members of the Wyoming Senate

House of Representatives

Leadership

Members of the Wyoming House of Representatives

References

Wyoming legislative sessions